Minda Mathea Olava Ramm  (27 December 1859 – 11 April 1924) was a Norwegian novelist, translator and literary critic.

Early life
Ramm was born in Sogndal, to Vally Marie Caroline Juell and parish priest Jens Ludvig Carl Olsen. While being a student in Kristiania, she was a founding member of the women's discussion society , a forerunner to the Norwegian Association for Women's Rights. Ramm served as the society's first secretary, while the other five co-founders were Cecilie Thoresen, Anna Bugge, Marie Holst, and Betzy Børresen (later Kjelsberg). Ramm graduated as cand.real. in 1890. In 1893 she married writer Hans E. Kinck. Shortly after their marriage, the couple travelled to Paris, where they stayed for about one year.

Literary career
Ramm made her literary debut in 1896, with the novel Lommen ("The Pocket"), where a female student tells her story. Later books include Overtro. Skildringer fra ottiårene ("Superstition. Narratives from the Eighties") (1898), a psychological study. Further the satirical Valgaar ("Election Year") from 1909, and finally Fotfæste ("Footgrip") from 1918, which has been described as her major work.

References

Bibliography

1859 births
1924 deaths
People from Sogndal
Norwegian novelists
Norwegian women novelists
Norwegian translators
Norwegian literary critics
Norwegian women critics
Women literary critics
Norwegian women non-fiction writers
Norwegian women writers
Norwegian expatriates in France